The city of Ottawa, Canada held municipal elections on December 5, 1927 to elect members of the 1928 Ottawa City Council.

Mayor of Ottawa
Controller Arthur Ellis defeated incumbent mayor John P. Balharrie and future mayor Patrick Nolan in a three-way race. Ellis won all but two of the city's nine wards, losing just the western wards of Dalhousie and Victoria to Nolan.

Ottawa Board of Control
(4 elected)

Ottawa City Council
(2 elected from each ward)

References
Ottawa Citizen, December 6, 1927

Municipal elections in Ottawa
1927 elections in Canada
1920s in Ottawa
1927 in Ontario